Goyenda Tatar is a Bengali adventure detective film directed by Srikanta Galui and produced by Binod Kumar Pandey and Usha Pande. Music is composed by Anirban Ray Akash. The storyline of the film is based on the story, Chotur Goyenda Choturabhijan, by Sasthipada Chattopathyay, and follows a group of kids led by Goenda Tatar, who are dragged into a kidnapping case. The film was theatrically released on 4 January 2019.

Plot
A bunch of adventurous kids and their leader Tatar are dragged into a mysterious kidnapping case. Their friend Sonai, an orphan was kidnapped by a notorious gang. They are helped by an ex-dacoit, Suleiman and bohemian Sentu da in solving the case.

Cast 
 Adhiraj Ganguly as Tatar
 Kharaj Mukherjee as police officer
 Rajatava Dutta as Suleiman
 Shantilal Mukherjee as Abbas
 Monu Mukherjee
 Biswajit Das as Sentu Da
 Swarnavo Goshwami as Shanku
 Kuntal Show as Chotu
 Joybrata Das as Debu
 Sridatri Sarkar as Tinku
 Debapriya Basu as Sonai

Release
The official trailer of the film was released by Amara Muzik Bengali on 5 September 2018.

The film was theatrically released on 4 January 2019.

References

External links
 

2019 films
Indian detective films
Indian adventure films
Films based on Indian novels
Indian children's films
Bengali-language Indian films
2010s Bengali-language films